Matthew Todd Henderson is an American legal scholar and novelist who is the Michael J. Marks Professor of Law at the University of Chicago Law School. He is an expert on corporate law and securities regulation.

Life and career

Henderson graduated from Princeton University with a Bachelor of Science in Engineering cum laude in 1993. He was a member of Sigma Xi. He worked for several years designing and building dams in California before commencing his studies at the University of Chicago Law School, where he graduated in 1998 with a Juris Doctor magna cum laude and was a member of the Order of the Coif and an editor of the University of Chicago Law Review.

After graduating from law school, Henderson clerked for Judge Dennis Jacobs of the United States Court of Appeals for the Second Circuit. Between 1999 and 2001, he practiced as an attorney at Kirkland & Ellis, where he worked alongside now Supreme Court of the United States justice Brett Kavanaugh. Henderson later joined McKinsey & Company as an engagement manager, specializing in counseling telecommunications and high-tech clients on business and regulatory strategy.

Henderson joined the faculty at the University of Chicago Law School in 2004. He served as Aaron Director Teaching Scholar between 2013 and 2015. He has taught and written in the areas of corporate law, securities regulation, derivates, business law, American Indian law, and torts. In particular, he has published books on corporate governance, law and economics, and the intersection of technology and the law, and co-authored casebooks on federal securities law. and securities regulation.

Henderson is the author of Mental State (2018), a murder mystery novel.

References

20th-century American lawyers
21st-century American lawyers
Year of birth missing (living people)
Living people
American legal scholars
American legal writers
People associated with Kirkland & Ellis
Princeton University alumni
University of Chicago Law School alumni